Ni Xiaoli (born 29 January 1983) is a Chinese sprinter who specialized in the 200 metres.

She won the silver medal at the 2002 Asian Games and the bronze medal at the 2005 Asian Championships.

Her personal best time is 23.12 seconds, achieved in September 2004 in Hefei.

References

1983 births
Living people
Chinese female sprinters
Asian Games medalists in athletics (track and field)
Athletes (track and field) at the 2002 Asian Games
Universiade medalists in athletics (track and field)
Asian Games silver medalists for China
Medalists at the 2002 Asian Games
Universiade gold medalists for China
Medalists at the 2003 Summer Universiade
21st-century Chinese women